Altivasum is a genus of sea snails, marine gastropod mollusks in the family Turbinellidae.

Species
Species within the genus Altivasum include:
 Altivasum clarksoni S. J. Maxwell & Dekkers, 2019
 Altivasum flindersi Verco, 1914
 Altivasum hedleyi S. J. Maxwell & Dekkers, 2019
 Altivasum profundum Dekkers & S. J. Maxwell, 2018)
Species brought into synonymy
 Altivasum typicum Hedley, 1916: synonym of Altivasum flindersi Verco, 1914

References

 Dekkers A.M. & Maxwell S.J. (2018). Altivasum Hedley, 1914 (Gastropoda: Turbinellidae) from South Western Australia. The Festivus. 50(4): 245–254.

External links

 Hedley C. (1914). Mollusca. Biological results of the fishing experiments carried on by the F.I.S. "Endeavour" 1909-1914. 2(2): 63-74, pls 8-12

Turbinellidae
Gastropod genera